The Crasna is a right tributary of the river Teleajen in Romania. It discharges into the Teleajen in Izvoarele.

References

Rivers of Romania
Rivers of Prahova County